The Iranian languages, also called Iranic languages, are a branch of the Indo-Iranian languages in the Indo-European language family that are spoken natively by the Iranian peoples, predominantly in the Iranian Plateau.

The Iranian languages are grouped in three stages: Old Iranian (until 400 BCE), Middle Iranian (400 BCE – 900 CE) and New Iranian (since 900 CE). The two directly-attested Old Iranian languages are Old Persian (from the Achaemenid Empire) and Old Avestan (the language of the Avesta). Of the Middle Iranian languages, the better understood and recorded ones are Middle Persian (from the Sasanian Empire), Parthian (from the Parthian Empire), and Bactrian (from the Kushan and Hephthalite empires).

Number of speakers 
, there were an estimated 150–200 million native speakers of the Iranian languages. Ethnologue estimates that there are 86 languages in the group.

Terminology and grouping

Iranian vs. Iranic 
The term Iranian is applied to any language which descends from the ancestral Proto-Iranian language. 
 
Some scholars such as John R. Perry prefer the term Iranic as the anthropological name for the linguistic family and ethnic groups of this category, and Iranian for anything about the modern country of Iran. He uses the same analogue as in differentiating German from Germanic or differentiating Turkish and Turkic.

This use of the term for the Iranian language family was introduced in 1836 by Christian Lassen. Robert Needham Cust used the term Irano-Aryan in 1878, and Orientalists such as George Abraham Grierson and Max Müller contrasted Irano-Aryan (Iranian) and Indo-Aryan (Indic). Some recent scholarship, primarily in German, has revived this convention.

Grouping 
The Iranian languages are divided into the following branches:
The Western Iranian languages, subdivided into:
 Southwestern, of which Persian (including the Dari and Tajik dialects) and Luri are the dominant members;
 Northwestern, of which the Kurdish languages are the dominant members.
The Eastern Iranian languages, subdivided into:
 Southeastern, of which Pashto is the dominant member;
 Northeastern, by far the smallest branch, of which Ossetian is the dominant member.

According to modern scholarship, the Avestan languages are not considered to fall under these categories, and are instead sometimes classified as Central Iranian, since they diverged from Proto-Iranian before the east-west division rose to prominence. It has traditionally been viewed as Eastern Iranian; however, it lacks a large number of Eastern Iranian features and thus is only "Eastern Iranian" in the sense that it is not Western.

Proto-Iranian

The Iranian languages all descend from a common ancestor: Proto-Iranian, which itself evolved from Proto-Indo-Iranian. This ancestor language is speculated to have origins in Central Asia, and the Andronovo culture of the Bronze Age is suggested as a candidate for the common Indo-Iranian culture around 2000 BCE.

The language was situated precisely in the western part of Central Asia that borders present-day Russia and Kazakhstan. It was thus in relative proximity to the other satem ethno-linguistic groups of the Indo-European family, such as Thracian, Balto-Slavic and others, and to common Indo-European's original homeland (more precisely, the Eurasian Steppe to the north of the Caucasus), according to the reconstructed linguistic relationships of common Indo-European.

Proto-Iranian thus dates to some time after the Proto-Indo-Iranian breakup, or the early-2nd millennium BCE, as the Old Iranian languages began to break off and evolve separately as the various Iranian tribes migrated and settled in vast areas of southeastern Europe, the Iranian Plateau, and Central Asia.

Proto-Iranian innovations compared to Proto-Indo-Iranian include: the turning of sibilant fricative *s into non-sibilant fricative glottal *h; the voiced aspirated plosives *bʰ, *dʰ, *gʰ yielding to the voiced unaspirated plosives *b, *d, *g resp.; the voiceless unaspirated stops *p, *t, *k before another consonant changing into fricatives *f, *θ, *x resp.; voiceless aspirated stops *pʰ, *tʰ, *kʰ turning into fricatives *f, *θ, *x, resp.

Old Iranian
The multitude of Middle Iranian languages and peoples indicate that great linguistic diversity must have existed among the ancient speakers of Iranian languages. Of that variety of languages/dialects, direct evidence of only two has survived. These are:
 Avestan, the two languages/dialects of the Avesta (the liturgical texts of Zoroastrianism).
 Old Persian, the native language of a southwestern Iranian people known as Persians.
Indirectly attested Old Iranian languages are discussed below.

Old Persian was an Old Iranian dialect as it was spoken in southwestern Iran (the modern-day province of Fars) by the inhabitants of Parsa, Persia, or Persis who also gave their name to their region and language. Genuine Old Persian is best attested in one of the three languages of the Behistun inscription, composed circa 520 BCE, and which is the last inscription (and only inscription of significant length) in which Old Persian is still grammatically correct. Later inscriptions are comparatively brief, and typically simply copies of words and phrases from earlier ones, often with grammatical errors, which suggests that by the 4th century BCE the transition from Old Persian to Middle Persian was already far advanced, but efforts were still being made to retain an "old" quality for official proclamations.

The other directly attested Old Iranian dialects are the two forms of Avestan, which take their name from their use in the Avesta, the liturgical texts of indigenous Iranian religion that now goes by the name of Zoroastrianism but in the Avesta itself is simply known as vohu daena (later: behdin). The language of the Avesta is subdivided into two dialects, conventionally known as "Old (or 'Gathic') Avestan", and "Younger Avestan". These terms, which date to the 19th century, are slightly misleading since 'Younger Avestan' is not only much younger than 'Old Avestan', but also from a different geographic region. The Old Avestan dialect is very archaic, and at roughly the same stage of development as Rigvedic Sanskrit. On the other hand, Younger Avestan is at about the same linguistic stage as Old Persian, but by virtue of its use as a sacred language retained its "old" characteristics long after the Old Iranian languages had yielded to their Middle Iranian stage. Unlike Old Persian, which has Middle Persian as its known successor, Avestan has no clearly identifiable Middle Iranian stage (the effect of Middle Iranian is indistinguishable from effects due to other causes).

In addition to Old Persian and Avestan, which are the only directly attested Old Iranian languages, all Middle Iranian languages must have had a predecessor "Old Iranian" form of that language, and thus can all be said to have  had an (at least hypothetical) "Old" form. Such hypothetical Old Iranian languages include Old Parthian. Additionally, the existence of unattested languages can sometimes be inferred from the impact they had on neighbouring languages. Such transfer is known to have occurred for Old Persian, which has (what is called) a "Median" substrate in some of its vocabulary. Also, foreign references to languages can also provide a hint to the existence of otherwise unattested languages, for example through toponyms/ethnonyms or in the recording of vocabulary, as Herodotus did for what he called "Scythian" and in one instance, Median (σπάκα "dog").

Isoglosses
Conventionally, Iranian languages are grouped into "western" and "eastern" branches. These terms have little meaning with respect to Old Avestan as that stage of the language may predate the settling of the Iranian peoples into western and eastern groups. The geographic terms also have little meaning when applied to Younger Avestan since it isn't known where that dialect (or dialects) was spoken either. Certain is only that Avestan (all forms) and Old Persian are distinct, and since Old Persian is "western", and Avestan was not Old Persian, Avestan acquired a default assignment to "eastern". Further confusing the issue is the introduction of a western Iranian substrate in later Avestan compositions and redactions undertaken at the centers of imperial power in western Iran (either in the south-west in Persia, or in the north-west in Nisa/Parthia and Ecbatana/Media).

Two of the earliest dialectal divisions among Iranian indeed happen to not follow the later division into Western and Eastern blocks. These concern the fate of the Proto-Indo-Iranian first-series palatal consonants, *ć and *dź:
 Avestan and most other Iranian languages have deaffricated and depalatalized these consonants, and have *ć > s, *dź > z.
 Old Persian, however, has fronted these consonants further: *ć > θ, *dź > *ð > d.
As a common intermediate stage, it is possible to reconstruct depalatalized affricates: *c, *dz. (This coincides with the state of affairs in the neighboring Nuristani languages.) A further complication however concerns the consonant clusters *ćw and *dźw:
 Avestan and most other Iranian languages have shifted these clusters to sp, zb.
 In Old Persian, these clusters yield s, z, with loss of the glide *w, but without further fronting.
 The Saka language, attested in the Middle Iranian period, and its modern relative Wakhi fail to fit into either group: in these, palatalization remains, and similar glide loss as in Old Persian occurs: *ćw > š, *dźw > ž.

A division of Iranian languages in at least three groups during the Old Iranian period is thus implied:
 Persid (Old Persian and its descendants)
 Sakan (Saka, Wakhi, and their Old Iranian ancestor)
 Central Iranian (all other Iranian languages)

It is possible that other distinct dialect groups were already in existence during this period. Good candidates are the hypothetical ancestor languages of Alanian/Scytho-Sarmatian subgroup of Scythian in the far northwest; and the hypothetical "Old Parthian" (the Old Iranian ancestor of Parthian) in the near northwest, where original *dw > *b (paralleling the development of *ćw).

Middle Iranian
What is known in Iranian linguistic history as the "Middle Iranian" era is thought to begin around the 4th century BCE lasting through the 9th century. Linguistically the Middle Iranian languages are conventionally classified into two main groups, Western and Eastern.

The Western family includes Parthian (Arsacid Pahlavi) and Middle Persian, while Bactrian, Sogdian, Khwarezmian, Saka, and Old Ossetic (Scytho-Sarmatian) fall under the Eastern category. The two languages of the Western group were linguistically very close to each other, but quite distinct from their eastern counterparts. On the other hand, the Eastern group was an areal entity whose languages retained some similarity to Avestan. They were inscribed in various Aramaic-derived alphabets which had ultimately evolved from the Achaemenid Imperial Aramaic script, though Bactrian was written using an adapted Greek script.

Middle Persian (Pahlavi) was the official language under the Sasanian dynasty in Iran. It was in use from the 3rd century CE until the beginning of the 10th century. The script used for Middle Persian in this era underwent significant maturity. Middle Persian, Parthian, and Sogdian were also used as literary languages by the Manichaeans, whose texts also survive in various non-Iranian languages, from Latin to Chinese. Manichaean texts were written in a script closely akin to the Syriac script.

New Iranian

Following the Arab conquest of Persia, there were important changes in the role of the different dialects within the Persian Empire. The old prestige form of Middle Iranian, also known as Pahlavi, was replaced by a new standard dialect called Dari as the official language of the court. The name Dari comes from the word darbâr (دربار), which refers to the royal court, where many of the poets, protagonists and patrons of the literature flourished. The Saffarid dynasty in particular was the first in a line of many dynasties to officially adopt the new language in 875 CE. Dari may have been heavily influenced by regional dialects of eastern Iran, whereas the earlier Pahlavi standard was based more on western dialects. This new prestige dialect became the basis of  Standard New Persian. Medieval Iranian scholars such as Abdullah Ibn al-Muqaffa (8th century) and Ibn al-Nadim (10th century) associated the term "Dari" with the eastern province of Khorasan, while they used the term "Pahlavi" to describe the dialects of the northwestern areas between Isfahan and Azerbaijan, and "Pârsi" ("Persian" proper) to describe the dialects of Fars (Persia). They also noted that the unofficial language of the royalty itself was yet another dialect, "Khuzi", associated with the western province of Khuzestan.

The Islamic conquest also brought with it the adoption of the Arabic script for writing Persian and much later, Kurdish, Pashto and Balochi. All three were adapted to the writing by the addition of a few letters. This development probably occurred sometime during the second half of the 8th century, when the old middle Persian script began dwindling in usage. The Arathbic script remains in use in contemporary modern Persian. Tajik script, used to write the Tajik language, was first Latinised in the 1920s under the then-Soviet nationality policy. The script was however subsequently Cyrillicized in the 1930s by the Soviet government.

The geographical regions in which Iranian languages were spoken were pushed back in several areas by newly neighbouring languages. Arabic spread into some parts of Western Iran (Khuzestan), and Turkic languages spread through much of Central Asia, displacing various Iranian languages such as Sogdian and Bactrian in parts of what is today Turkmenistan, Uzbekistan and Tajikistan. In Eastern Europe, mostly comprising the territory of modern-day Ukraine, southern European Russia, and parts of the Balkans, the core region of the native Scythians, Sarmatians, and Alans had been decisively taken over as a result of absorption and assimilation (e.g. Slavicisation) by the various Proto-Slavic population of the region, by the 6th century CE. This resulted in the displacement and extinction of the once predominant Scythian languages of the region. Sogdian's close relative Yaghnobi barely survives in a small area of the Zarafshan valley east of Samarkand, and Saka as Ossetic in the Caucasus, which is the sole remnant of the once predominant Scythian languages in Eastern Europe proper and large parts of the North Caucasus. Various small Iranian languages in the Pamir Mountains survive that are derived from Eastern Iranian.

Comparison table

Notes

References

Bibliography

 Bailey, H. W. (1979). Dictionary of Khotan Saka. Cambridge University Press. 1979. 1st Paperback edition 2010. .

 

 Toroghdar, Zia (2018). "From Astara to Fuman: Comparison words from dialects of different languages Talysh and Tatic". Farhang-e Ilia. pp. 38–172.

Further reading
Sokolova, V. S. "New information on the phonetics of Iranic languages." Trudy Instituta jazykoznanija NN SSR (Moskva) 1 (1952): 178-192.
Jügel, Thomas. "Word-order variation in Middle Iranic: Persian, parthian, Bactrian, and Sogdian." Word order variation: Semitic, Turkic, and Indo-European languages in contact, Studia Typologica [STTYP] 31 (2022): 39-62.

External links

Society for Iranian Linguistics
Kurdish and other Iranic Languages
Iranian EFL Journal
Iranian language tree in Russian, identical with above classification.
 Old Iranian Online by Scott L. Harvey and Jonathan Slocum, free online lessons at the Linguistics Research Center at the University of Texas at Austin

Indo-European languages